The 1st House of Commons of Northern Ireland was elected at the 1921 Northern Ireland general election.

All members of the Northern Ireland House of Commons are listed. Only Unionist members took their seats. Sinn Féin members sat instead in the republicans Second Dáil, alongside those elected to the Southern Ireland House of Commons; while Nationalist Party members refused to sit in either the Northern Ireland Parliament or the republican Dáil.

Sir James Craig, (later Viscount Craigavon) was appointed Prime Minister of Northern Ireland on 7 June 1921.

Members

Notes 
 Joseph Devlin was elected for both Antrim and Belfast West, but did not take either seat in parliament.
 Maj. Hon. Robert William O'Neill was Speaker of the House from 7 June 1921 to 2 May 1929.

Changes 
 William Twaddell (UUP, Belfast West) was assassinated by the IRA on 22 May 1922. The resulting by-election was won by Philip James Woods (Independent Unionist).

References
Biographies of Members of the Northern Ireland House of Commons

1921